Brümmer is a surname. Notable people with the name include 
 Günter Brümmer (1933–2020), German slalom canoeist
 Jürgen Brümmer (1964–2014), German gymnast and physical therapist
 Kai Luke Brümmer (born 1993), South African actor
 Renate Brümmer (born 1955), German meteorologist and astronaut
 Vincent Brümmer (1932–2021), South African theologian

See also
 Brummer (disambiguation)

German-language surnames